Kalmusia is a genus of fungi in the family Montagnulaceae. The genus is estimated to contain about 12 widespread species.

The genus name of Kalmusia is in honour of Jakub Kalmus (1834 - 1870), who was a Bohemian doctor and Cryptogam researcher, who was a friend of the plant authr.

The genus was circumscribed by Gustav Niessl von Mayendorf in Verh. Naturf. Vereins Brünn vol.10 on page 204 in 1872.

References

Pleosporales
Dothideomycetes genera
Taxa described in 1872